Senator Gannett may refer to:

Barzillai Gannett (1764–1832), Massachusetts State Senate
Robert T. Gannett (1917–2012), Vermont State Senate